Lydia Grigorieva (born 1945) is a Ukrainian poet who now lives in London. Her work has been widely translated and she has worked with the BBC World Service, Russian radio and television and the British Library.

Also described as a "photo-artist", Grigorieva uses a synthesis of poetry and photography in her work. The premiere of her Photo-Poetry took place at the State Pushkin Museum in Moscow.
 
In 2011 she took part in a seminar at the London Book Fair titled At the Crossroads of Culture: Russian Writers Living in London.

Grigorieva read her work for the British Library's Dual Cultures, Between Two Worlds: Poetry and Translation project which explores the work of poets living in the UK whose first language is not English.

Films written by Grigorieva include:
Tsvetaeva in London
Gumilev in London
Skriabin in London

References

External links
Lydia Grigorieva reading her poetry at the British Library Archival Sound Recordings

Ukrainian women poets
Living people
1945 births
Ukrainian emigrants to the United Kingdom
Ukrainian photographers
Ukrainian women photographers